The 1972–73 Athenian League season was the 50th in the history of Athenian League. The league consisted of 46 teams.

Premier Division

The division featured two new teams, promoted from last season's Division One:
 Harlow Town  (1st)
 Croydon Amateurs (2nd)

League table

Division One

The division featured 3 new teams:
 1 relegated from last season's Premier Division:
 Grays Athletic  (16th)
 2 promoted from last season's Division Two:
 Staines Town (1st)
 Worthing (2nd)

League table

Division Two

The division featured no new teams.

Ruislip Manor and Ware promoted two divisions.

League table

References

1972–73 in English football leagues
Athenian League